Iroquois Island is an island off the southeast shore of Lake Superior. The island is located in Bay Mills Township, Chippewa County, Michigan. The 6 acre island is what makes up the Iroquois Island Nature Preserve.

References

Islands of Lake Superior in Michigan
Islands of Chippewa County, Michigan